Tristerix longebracteatus is a species of Tristerix  found in Colombia and Ecuador

References

External links

longebracteatus
Flora of the Andes